Frank Henry Greteman (December 25, 1907 – March 21, 1987) was an American prelate of the Roman Catholic Church who served as bishop of the Diocese of Sioux City in Iowa from 1970 to 1983.  He previously served as an auxiliary bishop of the same diocese from 1965 to 1970,

Biography

Early life 
Frank Greteman was born on December 25, 1907, in Willey, Iowa, to Bernard and Mary (née Meissner) Greteman. He graduated from Loras College in 1929 with a Bachelor of Arts degree.  Greteman then attended the Pontifical North American College in Rome, earning a Licentiate of Sacred Theology in 1933.

Priesthood 
Greteman was ordained a priest by Cardinal Francesco Marchetti Selvaggiani for the Diocese of Sioux City in Rome on December 8, 1932.  After his ordination, he served as a curate at St. Augustine Parish in Spokane, Washington until 1935.

Greteman earned a Licentiate of Canon Law from The Catholic University of America in Washington, D.C. in 1937. Returning to Iowa, Greteman served as pastor in the following Iowa parishes: 

 Assumption Parish in Merrill (1937–1941) 
 St. Michael Parish in Sioux City (1941–1950) 
 SS. Peter & Paul Parish in Carroll (1950–1964)
 Holy Spirit Parish in Carroll (1964–65). 

Greteman was named a domestic prelate in 1953, and vicar general of the diocese in 1965.

Auxiliary Bishop and Bishop of Sioux City 
On April 14, 1965, Greteman was appointed auxiliary bishop of the Diocese of Sioux City and titular bishop of Vissalsa by Pope Paul VI. Greteman received his episcopal consecration on May 26, 1965, from Archbishop Egidio Vagnozzi, with Archbishop James Byrne and Bishop Joseph Mueller serving as co-consecrators. 

Following the resignation of Bishop Mueller, Paul VI named Greteman as the fourth bishop of Sioux City on October 15, 1970. The main focus of his episcopate was Catholic education. He ordained Archbishop Dennis Schnurr of Cincinnati as a bishop.

Retirement and legacy 
Upon reaching the mandatory retirement age of 75, Greteman submitted his letter of resignation to Pope John Paul II on December 1982. The pope accepted his resignation on August 17, 1983, and named Reverend Lawrence Soens as his successor. 

Frank Greteman died in Palm Beach, Florida, on March 21, 1987 at age 79.

See also

References

1907 births
1987 deaths
Loras College alumni
People from Carroll County, Iowa
Participants in the Second Vatican Council
20th-century Roman Catholic bishops in the United States
Roman Catholic bishops of Sioux City
Catholic University of America alumni